Beer game may refer to:

Drinking games, that is, games involving drinking beer or other alcoholic beverages
Beer and pretzels game, a tabletop game
Beer Distribution Game, a simulation game developed at MIT to demonstrate key principles of supply chain management